George Lynch may refer to:

George Lynch-Staunton (1858–1940), Canadian politician
George Lynch (Chief Medical Officer) (1861–1940), British physician and Chief Medical Officer in Fiji between 1908 and 1919
George Edward Lynch (1917–2003), American bishop
George Lynch (racing driver) (1918–1997), American Indianapolis 500 competitor
George Lynch (musician) (born 1954), American member of the heavy metal band Dokken
George Lynch (basketball) (born 1970), American NCAA champion and NBA player

See also
Lynch (surname)